The 2014 UIFL season was the fourth and what would be the final season for the Ultimate Indoor Football League (UIFL). The league went to 4 teams to start the season Corpus Christi Fury, Florida Tarpons, Missouri Voodoo and Miami Inferno. On July 12, 2014, it was announced that the Miami Inferno were suspended for the remainder of the 2014 season and all games would be forfeited. It was also announced that Ultimate Bowl IV would be played on August 2, 2014. The game featured Corpus Christi Fury vs. Florida Tarpons, with the Fury winning 60–23.

Standings

y - clinched league regular-season title
x - clinched playoff spot

References

2014 Ultimate Indoor Football League season